The chief financial officer (CFO) is an officer of a company or organization that is assigned the primary responsibility for managing the company's finances, including financial planning, management of financial risks, record-keeping, and financial reporting. In some sectors, the CFO is also responsible for analysis of data. Some CFOs have the title CFOO for chief financial and operating officer. In the majority of countries, finance directors (FD) typically report into the CFO and FD is the level before reaching CFO. The CFO typically reports to the chief executive officer (CEO) and the board of directors and may additionally have a seat on the board. The CFO supervises the finance unit and is the chief financial spokesperson for the organization. The CFO directly assists the chief operating officer (COO) on all business matters relating to budget management, cost–benefit analysis, forecasting needs, and securing of new funding.

Qualification
Most CFOs of large companies have finance qualifications such as a Master of Business Administration (MBA), Master of Science (in either Finance or Accounting), CFA or come from an accounting background such as a Certified Public Accountant. A finance department usually consists of qualified accountants such as Certified Public Accountant, Chartered Accountant, Certified Management Accountant, Chartered Certified Accountant.

Federal government of the United States
The federal government of the United States has incorporated more elements of business-sector practices in its management approaches, including the use of the CFO position alongside, for example, an increased use of the chief information officer post, within public agencies.

The Chief Financial Officers Act, enacted in 1990, created a chief financial officer in each of 23 federal agencies. This was intended to improve the government's financial management and develop standards of financial performance and disclosure. The Office of Management and Budget (OMB) holds primary responsibility for financial management standardization and improvement. Within OMB, the Deputy Director for Management, a position established by the CFO Act, is the chief official responsible for financial management.

The Office of Federal Financial Management (OFFM) is specifically charged with overseeing financial management matters, establishing financial management policies and requirements, and monitoring the establishment and operation of federal financial management systems. OFFM is led by a controller.

The CFO Act also established the CFO Council, chair by the OMB Deputy Director for Management and including the CFOs and Deputy CFOs of 23 federal agencies, the OFFM controller, and the Fiscal Assistant Secretary, the head of the Office of Fiscal Service of the Department of the Treasury. Its mandate is to work collaboratively to improve financial management in the U.S. government and "advise and coordinate the activities of the agencies of its members" in the areas of financial management and accountability.

OMB Circular A-123 (issued 21 December 2004) defines the management responsibilities for internal financial controls in federal agencies and addressed to all federal CFOs, CIOs and Program Managers. The circular is a re-examination of the existing internal control requirements for federal agencies and was initiated in light of the new internal control requirements for publicly traded companies contained in the Sarbanes–Oxley Act of 2002.

While significant progress in improving federal financial management has been made since the federal government began preparing consolidated financial statements, the Government Accountability Office (GAO) reported that "major impediments continue to prevent [GAO] from rendering an opinion." In December 2006, the GAO announced that for the 10th consecutive year, the GAO was prevented from expressing an opinion on the consolidated financial statements of the government due to a number of material weaknesses related to financial systems, fundamental recordkeeping, and financial reporting.

At the same time, in calendar year 2007, the CFOC announced that for the second consecutive year, every major federal agency completed its Performance and Accountability Report just 25 days after the end of the fiscal year (2006).

Changing role
The role of the CFO has evolved significantly. Traditionally being viewed as a financial gatekeeper, the role of the CFO has expanded and evolved to an advisor and a strategic partner to the CEO.  In fact, in a report released by McKinsey, 88 percent of 164 CFOs surveyed reported that CEOs expect them to be more active participants in shaping the strategy of their organizations. Half of them also indicated that CEOs counted on them to challenge the company's strategy. As a result, the 1990s saw the rise of the strategic CFO, and more recently many companies have created a chief strategy officer (CSO) position.  As a result, a 2016 survey of CFOs suggests that their new role has focused on financial reporting, with 52% of CFOs still finding themselves bogged down in the basics of traditional accounting practices such as transaction reporting and unable to make time for business partnering. The rise of digital technologies and a focus on data analytics to support decision making impacting almost every industry and organization will only add more pressure on CFOs to address this tension on finding the time to meet the expectations of their C-Suite colleagues. Many organizations have embarked on the journey to help achieve this by creating a finance function based on four distinct pillars - An Accounting organization structured as a shared service, an FP&A organization responsible for driving financial planning processes as well as driving increased insight into financial and non financial KPIs that drive business performance, a Finance Business Partnering organization that supports the leadership of divisions, regions, functions to drive performance improvement and, last but not least, expertise centers around the areas of Tax, Treasury, Internal Audit, Investor Relations, etc.

According to one source, "The CFO of tomorrow should be a big-picture thinker, rather than detail-oriented, outspoken rather than reserved, prefer to delegate rather than be hands-on, emphasize what gets done rather than how things are done, and make collaborative rather than unilateral decisions. The CFO must serve as the financial authority in the organization, ensuring the integrity of fiscal data and modeling transparency and accountability. The CFO is as much a part of governance and oversight as the Chief Executive Officer (CEO), playing a fundamental role in the development and critique of strategic choices. The CFO is now expected to be a key player in stockholder education and communication and is clearly seen as a leader and team builder who sets the financial agenda for the organization, supports the CEO directly and provides timely advice to the board of directors."

The uneven pace of recovery worldwide has made it more challenging for many companies. CFOs play a more critical role in shaping their company's strategies today, especially in light of the highly uncertain macroeconomic environments, where managing financial volatilities is a centerpiece for many companies' strategies, based on a survey held by Clariden Global. CFOs are increasingly being relied upon as the owners of business information, reporting and financial data within organizations and assisting in decision support operations to enable the company to operate more effectively and efficiently.

The duties of a modern CFO now straddle the traditional areas of financial stewardship and the more progressive areas of strategic and business leadership with direct responsibility and oversight of operations (which often includes procurement) expanding exponentially. This significant role-based transformation, which is well underway, is best-evidenced by the "CEO-in-Waiting" status that many CFOs now hold. Additionally, many CFOs have made the realization that an operating environment that values cash, profit margins, and risk mitigation is one that plays to the primary skills and capabilities of a procurement organization, and become increasingly involved (directly via oversight or indirectly through improved collaboration) with the procurement function according to a recent research report that looks at the CFO's relationship with procurement.

See also
 Auditor general
 Comptroller
 Treasurer
 Virtual CFO

References

External links

 
Corporate titles
Management occupations
Corporate executives
Finance occupations